Agasanakatte  is a village in the southern state of Karnataka, India. It is located in the Davanagere taluk of Davanagere district.

See also
 Davanagere
 Districts of Karnataka

References

External links
 http://Davanagere.nic.in/

Villages in Davanagere district